Reni Raion was a raion (district) in Odessa Oblast in south-western Ukraine, in the historic Budjak region of Bessarabia. Its administrative center was the city of Reni. The raion was abolished and its territory was merged into Izmail Raion on 18 July 2020 as part of the administrative reform of Ukraine, which reduced the number of raions of Odessa Oblast to seven.  The last estimate of the raion population was  In 2001, population was 40,680.

The raion was predominantly Moldavian and the Ukrainian language was rare. According to the 2001 Ukrainian census the population was 49% Moldovan, 18% Ukrainian, 15% Russian, 8.5% Bulgarian and 8% Gagauz. Most of villages (five) are Romanophone while there was one village populated by Gagauz and another one was populated by Bulgarians. The city of Reni was mostly Russophone although 50% of its residents are Moldavians.

References

External links
  Reniyskyi Raion 
  Reniyskyi Raion

Former raions of Odesa Oblast
Romanian communities in Ukraine
1969 establishments in Ukraine
Ukrainian raions abolished during the 2020 administrative reform